Leonard Bernstein's Piano Trio for piano, violin, and cello was written in 1937 while he was attending Harvard University as a student of Walter Piston. He was influenced by the conductor Dmitri Mitropoulos. Several melodic ideas were recycled for use in later pieces. For example, the opening of the second movement was used later by Bernstein in his first musical, On the Town.

Premiere
The Trio was premiered in 1937 at Harvard University by the Madison Trio: Mildred Spiegel, Dorothy Rosenberg, Sarah Kruskall. It was published by Boosey & Hawkes.

Movements
The Trio is written in three movements:

Awards
In 2000, the  Altenberg Trio's recording of this piano trio won the Edison Award in Amsterdam.

References

Compositions by Leonard Bernstein
Bernstein